Buffy is the tenth album by Buffy Sainte-Marie and her first after leaving Vanguard Records, with whom her relationship had been strained for several albums.

Despite being on a different label from its predecessor Quiet Places, Buffy was recorded with essentially the same personnel in Norbert Putnam on bass, David Briggs on keyboards, Kenny Malone on drums and the Memphis Horns. Together, these gave a sound far removed from her initial folk roots and much closer to ordinary rock. Indeed, Buffy was recorded at much the same time and place as Quiet Places and no label took it up until her last Vanguard recordings had been released.

Despite Buffy commanding a high price tag upon completion, MCA did little to promote it. Very few music magazines ever bothered to review it and Buffy was out of print as early as 1978. 

The album cover caused MCA a public relations problem. Buffy posed with an exposed breast and refused to have it covered or censored. This caused some retailers in the United States, particularly in the Midwestern states, refusing to carry the album.    MCA arranged to have a price sticker placed over it which concealed the breast until the album's shrink wrap was removed.  

It has never been reissued independently since then and was only rereleased in 2008 with Changing Woman and Sweet America on the compilation album The Pathfinder: Buried Treasures - The Mid-70's Recordings.

Track listing
All songs written by Buffy Sainte-Marie except where noted.

References

Buffy (album)
Buffy (album)
Albums produced by Norbert Putnam
Buffy (album)